Karl Gottlieb Josef "Charlie" Roellinghoff (1897–1935) was a German screenwriter and novelist.

Selected filmography
 The Merry Farmer (1927)
 The Queen of Spades (1927)
 Eve's Daughters (1928)
 Alraune (1930)
 The Caviar Princess (1930)
 Fairground People (1930)
 Everybody Wins (1930)
 The Copper (1930)
 The Singing City (1930)
 Every Woman Has Something (1931)
 Headfirst into Happiness (1931)
 Holzapfel Knows Everything (1932)
 A Thousand for One Night (1933)
 Girls of Today (1933)
 There Goes Susie (1934)
 North Pole, Ahoy (1934)
 White Slaves (1937)

References

Bibliography
 Benson, Michael. Vintage Science Fiction Films, 1896-1949. McFarland, 2000.

External links

1897 births
1935 deaths
German male screenwriters
Writers from Munich
Film people from Munich
20th-century German screenwriters